Tai Shui Hang Village is a historic village within the Tai Shui Hang area, in Ma On Shan, Sha Tin District, New Territories, Hong Kong.

Administration
Tai Shui Hang Village is a recognized village under the New Territories Small House Policy.

Transportation

References

Further reading

External links

 Delineation of area of existing village Tai Shui Hang (Sha Tin) for election of resident representative (2019 to 2022)
 
 Antiquities Advisory Board. Historic Building Appraisal. Cheung Village House, No. 6 Tai Shui Hang Pictures
 Antiquities Advisory Board. Historic Building Appraisal. Cheung Village Houses, Nos. 16, 17 & 18 Tai Shui Hang Pictures

Tai Shui Hang
Villages in Sha Tin District, Hong Kong